SUPPORT for Patients and Communities Act, also known as Substance Use–Disorder Prevention that Promotes Opioid Recovery and Treatment for Patients and Communities Act, is a United States federal law, enacted during the 115th United States Congress, to make medical treatment for opioid addiction more widely available while also cracking down on illicit drugs. This piece of legislation is part of the ongoing conflict to stop and prevent the opioid epidemic in the United States. President Trump signed the bill on October 24, 2018.

President Donald Trump called it the “single largest bill to combat the drug crisis in the history of our country.”

Provisions and Short Titles
Abuse Deterrent Access Act of 2018
Access to Increased Drug Disposal Act of 2018
Advancing High Quality Treatment for Opioid Use Disorders in Medicare Act
CHIP Mental Health and Substance Use Disorder Parity Act
COACH Act of 2018
Combating Opioid Abuse for Care in Hospitals Act of 2018
Dr. Todd Graham Pain Management, Treatment, and Recovery Act of 2018

Eliminating Kickbacks in Recovery Act of 2018 (EKRA) 
The provision was originally sponsored by senators Marco Rubio and Amy Klobuchar.  EKRA targets patient brokers who recruit patients, shopping them to the provider offering the highest kickbacks.

EKRA is codified at 18 U.S.C. § 220. It generally prohibits anyone from paying, receiving, or soliciting, any remuneration in return for referrals to recovery homes, clinical treatment facilities, or laboratories.  In this respect, EKRA operates much like the Anti-Kickback Statute, 42 U.S.C. 1320a-7b(b), but focused on substance about recovery. Notably, EKRA prohibits paying for any referrals to clinical laboratories whether or not they perform substance abuse testing. 

Like the Anti-Kickback Statute, EKRA contains a number of safe-harbor relationships that do not trigger the statute's prohibition.  

In January 2020, the Department of Justice announced what is believed to be its first conviction under EKRA.  The target of the prosecution was an office manager of a substance abuse treatment clinic in Kentucky, who admitted to soliciting kickbacks from the CEO of a urine drug testing lab in exchange for the clinic's business. 
Empowering Pharmacists in the Fight Against Opioid Abuse Act
Expanding Oversight of Opioid Prescribing and Payment Act of 2018
Fighting Opioid Abuse in Transportation Act
IMD CARE Act
Individuals in Medicaid Deserve Care that is Appropriate and Responsible in its Execution Act
Medicaid IMD ADDITIONAL INFO Act
Medicaid Institutes for Mental Disease Are Decisive in Delivering Inpatient Treatment for Individuals but Opportunities for Needed Access are Limited without *Information Needed about Facility Obligations Act
Medicaid PARTNERSHIP Act
Medicaid Providers Are Required To Note Experiences in Record Systems to Help In-need Patients Act
Medicaid Reentry Act
Opioid Addiction Action Plan Act
Opioid Addiction Recovery Fraud Prevention Act of 2018
Opioid Quota Reform Act
PASS Act of 2018
PROPER Act of 2018
Preventing Addiction for Susceptible Seniors Act of 2018
Preventing Drug Diversion Act of 2018
Providing Reliable Options for Patients and Educational Resources Act of 2018
REACH OUT Act of 2018
REGROUP Act of 2018
Reauthorizing and Extending Grants for Recovery from Opioid Use Programs Act of 2018
Responsible Education Achieves Care and Healthy Outcomes for Users' Treatment Act of 2018
SCREEN Act
SOUND Disposal and Packaging Act
STOP Act of 2018
Safe Disposal of Unused Medication Act
Securing Opioids and Unused Narcotics with Deliberate Disposal and Packaging Act of 2018
Special Registration for Telemedicine Clarification Act of 2018
Stop Counterfeit Drugs by Regulating and Enhancing Enforcement Now Act
Stop Illicit Drug Importation Act of 2018
Substance Abuse Prevention Act of 2018
Synthetics Trafficking and Overdose Prevention Act of 2018
Treating Barriers to Prosperity Act of 2018
Using Data To Prevent Opioid Diversion Act of 2018

References

External links
H.R.6 - 115th Congress (2017-2018): SUPPORT for Patients and Communities Act
Trump signs sweeping opioid bill with vow to end 'scourge' of drug addiction
Trump signs bipartisan opioid bill aimed at curbing national crisis

United States federal law
Opioids in the United States